Billancourt is a station of the Paris Métro, located in the commune of Boulogne-Billancourt. It is named after the nearby rue de Billancourt, which was in turn named after the former village of Billancourt which was annexed in 1859 into the commune of Boulogne-Billancourt.

History 
The station opened on 3 February 1934 with the extension of the line from Porte de Saint-Cloud to Pont de Sèvres, which was the first extension of the métro network beyond the limits of Paris. Hence, it is one of the first three stations to provide service to the inner suburbs of Paris (along with Marcel Sembat and Pont de Sèvres).

As part of the "Renouveau du métro" programme by the RATP, the station's corridors was renovated and modernised on 26 July 2001.

In 2019, the station was used by 3,099,341 passengers, making it the 164th busiest of the Métro network out of 302 stations.

In 2020, the station was used by 1,525,990 passengers amidst the COVID-19 pandemic, making it the 173rd busiest of the Métro network out of 305 stations.

In 2021, the station was used by 1,967,532 passengers, making it the 180th busiest of the Métro network out of 305 stations.

Passenger services

Access 
The station has 4 accesses divided into 5 access points on either side of the avenue du Général-Leclerc.

 Access 1: rue de la Ferme
 Access 2: rue de Billancourt
 Access 3: rue Castéjà
 Access 4: rue de Silly

Station layout

Platforms 
The station has a standard configuration with 2 tracks surrounded by 2 side platforms.

Other connections 
The station is also served by line 389 of the RATP bus network, and at night, by lines N12 and N61 bus of the Noctilien network.

Gallery

References

Roland, Gérard (2003). Stations de métro. D’Abbesses à Wagram. Éditions Bonneton.

Paris Métro stations in Boulogne-Billancourt
Railway stations in France opened in 1934
Paris Métro line 9